The 43rd Golden Raspberry Awards, or Razzies, honored the worst the film industry had to offer in 2022 on March 10, 2023. The awards were based on votes from members of the Golden Raspberry Foundation. The nominations were announced on January 22, 2023. The biographical psychological drama Blonde received the most nominations with eight, including Worst Picture and Worst Director (Andrew Dominik), winning the former.

Winners and nominees

Films with multiple wins and nominations
The following films received multiple nominations:

The following films received multiple wins:

Controversy
The nomination of child actress Ryan Kiera Armstrong for Worst Actress for her performance in the Firestarter remake was the subject of backlash, alongside further criticism that child actors in the past had their careers harmed upon being nominated at the Razzies; such as Gary Coleman for On the Right Track (1981), Macaulay Culkin for Richie Rich (1994), and Jake Lloyd for Star Wars: Episode I – The Phantom Menace (1999). Fellow child actor Julian Hilliard said the Razzies "crossed a line" and the nomination put Armstrong at the risk of "bullying or worse". Drew Barrymore, a former child actress and star of the original film, also criticized the decision, stating: "I don't like it... Because she is younger and it is bullying, and we do want to be cautious about how we speak to or about people because it encourages other people to join on that bandwagon, and I'm glad to see people didn't jump on the 'let's make fun of her' wave and instead said 'This isn't right.'"

In the wake of the controversy, Razzies co-founder John J. B. Wilson explained that among the group's voters, Armstrong had come in fifth place out of five available spots and that, despite some concern due to her age (twelve at the time of the nomination announcement), members approved the nomination on the grounds that Armstrong was a professional actress with prior experience. Wilson suggested that the level of criticism the nomination received was "overblown", but also conceded, stating: "The intent was to be funny. In this particular instance, we seem to have misstepped very badly. I would admit that." Three days after the nomination was announced, Armstrong was removed from the ballot. Wilson issued a public apology and announced that the organization would no longer allow individuals under eighteen to be nominated in any category.

In another surprise, for the first time in Razzies history, the organization gave itself an award: Worst Actress. After enduring the controversy of initially nominating Armstrong, the organization put themselves in Armstrong's place on the ballot. It won by a landslide.

Notes

References

External links
 

2023 awards in the United States
Golden Raspberry
Golden Raspberry Awards ceremonies
March 2023 events in the United States